No Mercy is the first EP by South Korean male pop group B.A.P. It was released digitally on July 19, 2012, and physically on July 24, 2012 under the label of TS Entertainment. It features the singles "Goodbye" and "No Mercy".

On August 30, 2012, the repackaged version of the EP, renamed Crash, was digitally released. The repackage contained two new songs including "Crash" and "I Remember" (feat. Daehyun) along with the five previous tracks.

Background and release
The title of the EP was revealed on July 12, 2012, along with the album cover and track listing. The album jacket photos of the individual members were released on July 15 and 16, 2012, which introduced the urban pop boy concept for the promotions.

The first single from the EP is a pop-rock ballad, "Goodbye".  It features falsetto vocals and a strong rap. The song was composed by Jeon Daun, who also wrote G.NA's "Because You're My Person" and K.Will's "Struck Dumb", along with B.A.P member Yongguk. Yongguk also helped to pen the lyrics. "Goodbye" also featured guitarist TOP, who worked with Seo Taeji for over 10 years. The song and its music video were released digitally on July 9, 2012.

The second single, title track "No Mercy", is composed and produced by Marco and Jeon Daun of TS Entertainment. B.A.P member Yongguk helped with the lyrics. The rapping parts of the song utilizes the Gyeongsangdo dialect. It also makes use of "samul nori", a type of traditional Korean percussion music. This song is quite similar in comparison with group's previous singles "Warrior" and "Power", as it brings back many of the group's signature style, especially the use of whistles in the instrumental. The song was released digitally on July 18, 2012.

The No Mercy EP was released on July 19, 2012.

The repackaged version of the EP, entitled Crash (대박사건) and its title track were released on August 30, 2012.  The song is the work of Duble Sidekick, and has a British rock base mixed with guitar sounds.  It contains elements of pop rock, dance-rock and teen pop.

Non-promotional album track "Voicemail" is a hip hop-ballad song and the first by the group that is entirely written by member Yongguk. It integrates the use of phone sounds in the instrumental.

Promotion
B.A.P made their first live broadcast appearance promoting the EP on the July 19, 2012 episode of M! Countdown. This was followed by appearances on Music Bank, Show! Music Core, Inkigayo.

The 49-second animated music video for the track "Goodbye" was released on July 9, 2012 through YouTube along with the digital release of the single. The video features the group's mascot concept of the Matoki alien species that crash-landed on Earth, explaining the mythical origin of the group. The jacket photo of "Goodbye" reminded fans of The Beatles' Abbey Road album art cover photo.

The music video for "No Mercy" was directed by Hong Won-ki of Zanybros, who is famously known for directing music videos for Seo Taeji, Super Junior, Girls Generation, Secret and Beast.  The video highlighted the change in looks of the group members from street gangsters to "pop boys" but keeping true to their upbeat artistry and charismatic image.

The music video for "Crash" was released on August 30, 2012 through the official YouTube channel of TS Entertainment. It features the clips of moments from the making of the music video for their last single, "No Mercy", and shooting of the jacket photos for the No Mercy and Crash EPs.

Track listing

Release history
No Mercy was released digitally on July 19, 2012 under the label of TS Entertainment. The physical release was originally scheduled to be on July 19, 2012 as well but was delayed to July 24, 2012 because of the problems with the finished product. The special single "Goodbye" was released 10 days ahead of the album release whereas the lead single "No Mercy" was released on the same date as the album. On August 30, 2012, the repackaged version of the EP, renamed Crash, was released.

References

B.A.P (South Korean band) EPs
2012 EPs
Korean-language EPs
TS Entertainment EPs
Kakao M EPs